James Michael Sheehan (24 July 1885 – 10 April 1967) was an Australian trade unionist and politician.

Born in Castlemaine, Victoria, he received a primary education before becoming a railway worker. He was an organiser with the Australian Workers' Union and President of the Victorian Trades Hall Council, as well as being an active member of the Victorian Labor Party. On 12 July 1938, he was appointed to the Australian Senate for Victoria to fill a casual vacancy caused by the death of Labor Senator John Barnes. The Australian Constitution dictated that an appointment to a casual vacancy was required to be re-contested at the next election and while Sheehan was number one on the Labor ticket, he was defeated in 1940 with the UAP-Country coalition winning all four seats. He remained in the Senate until his retirement in 1961, taking effect in 1962.

Sheehan died in 1967, aged 81.

References

1885 births
1967 deaths
Australian Labor Party members of the Parliament of Australia
Members of the Australian Senate for Victoria
Members of the Australian Senate
20th-century Australian politicians
People from Castlemaine, Victoria